Anchinia grisescens is a species of moth of the family Depressariidae. It is found in France, Switzerland, Austria and Italy.

References

External links
lepiforum.de

Moths described in 1856
Anchinia
Moths of Europe